Zdzisław Pieńkowski is a former Polish competitive figure skater and three-time Polish national champion. He competed at four European Championships from 1966 to 1969. Pieńkowski married Barbara Kossowska, a skating coach and moved to the United States in the 1980s.

Competitive highlights

References 

Polish male single skaters
Living people
Place of birth missing (living people)
Year of birth missing (living people)